The 1983 Society of West End Theatre Awards were held in 1983 in London celebrating excellence in West End theatre by the Society of West End Theatre. The awards would not become the Laurence Olivier Awards, as they are known today, until the 1984 ceremony.

Winners and nominees
Details of winners (in bold) and nominees, in each award category, per the Society of London Theatre.

Productions with multiple nominations and awards
The following 20 productions, including one ballet and one opera, received multiple nominations:

 4: Pack of Lies
 3: Blood Brothers, Cyrano de Bergerac, Tales from Hollywood and The Rivals
 2: A Moon for the Misbegotten, As You Like It, Bashville, Beethoven's Tenth, Daisy Pulls It Off, Glengarry Glen Ross, Heartbreak House, King Lear, Little Shop of Horrors, Manon Lescaut, Snoopy, The Nightingale, The Provok'd Wife, The Slab Boys Trilogy and The Taming of the Shrew

The following four productions received multiple awards:

 3: Cyrano de Bergerac
 2: A Moon for the Misbegotten, Blood Brothers and Glengarry Glen Ross

See also
 37th Tony Awards

References

External links
 Previous Olivier Winners – 1983

Laurence Olivier Awards ceremonies
Laurence Olivier Awards, 1983
1983 in London
1983 theatre awards